What Alice Found is a Sundance award-winning feature film released in theaters in the United States in 2003 and 2004.  The independently made film was the second feature film for writer/director A. Dean Bell.

Plot 
The film is a harrowing coming of age tale about a young woman who flees her poor New Hampshire hometown life to follow her wealthier and socially accepted friend down to college life in Florida.  But her car breaks down on the highway under mysterious circumstances and a middle-aged "snowbird" couple in an RV come to her rescue, offering a ride all the way south.  Before too long we're wondering if it wasn't the seemingly good Samaritans who sabotaged her car in the first place.  What Alice Found is a complex story about mothers and daughters and the "haves and have-nots" in American society as Alice is turned into a truck stop prostitute.

Cast

Release 

The film was released in theaters in the United States in 2003 and 2004. It was released on home video in the United States in 2004. It has aired on the Sundance Channel, Lifetime Movie Network, IFC, and ABC affiliates across the United States, and on Canal Plus in France.

Critics 
What Alice Found was selected by The New York Times''' Stephen Holden as a "Critic's Pick", and was praised by Kevin Thomas in the Los Angeles Times: "Sweet, suspenseful, funny, poignant and adult.  Judith Ivey gives flat-out one of the year's best performances... a terrific showcase for lovely newcomer Emily Grace... an unexpected treat for sophisticated audiences".  Variety'' had Ms. Ivey as a dark horse Oscar candidate.

Honors and awards 
"What Alice Found" was awarded the Grand Prize at the 2003 Deauville Festival of American Cinema by Jury Chair Roman Polanski.  The film is held in the collection of the UCLA film archive and the screenplay was invited into the collection at the library of the Academy of Motion Picture Arts and Sciences.

 2003 Sundance Film Festival—Special Jury Award
 2003 Deauville France Festival—Grand Prize
 2003 Cinema Paradiso Festival (Hawaii) -- Best Feature Film
 2003 Tribeca Film Festival—Official Selection (competition)
 2003 Athens International Film Festival—Official Selection (competition)
 Official Selection—Stockholm Film Festival, Denver Stars Film Festival, Mill Valley Film Festival, Bangkok Film Festival

References

External links 
 
 A. Dean Bell
 www.whatalicefound.com
 rotten tomatoes
 trailer
 www.factoryfilmsnyc.com

2003 films